Malyi Bereznyi Port of Entry is a land border crossing between Ukraine and Slovakia on the Ukrainian side, near the village of Malyi Bereznyi, Velykyi Bereznyi Raion. The crossing is situated on autoroute I/74 - P53. Across the border on the Slovak side is the village of Ubľa. The Slovak border crossing simultaneously serves as a crossing with the European Union (Schengen Area).

The type of crossing is automobile, status - international. The types of transportation for automobile crossings are passenger and freight.

The port of entry is part of the Uzhhorod customs post of Chop customs.

See also
 Slovakia–Ukraine border
 State Border of Ukraine
 Uzhhorod (border checkpoint)

External links
 State Border Guard of Ukraine website 

Slovakia–Ukraine border crossings